Thalfang am Erbeskopf is a Verbandsgemeinde ("collective municipality") in the district Bernkastel-Wittlich, in Rhineland-Palatinate, Germany. Its seat of administration is in Thalfang.

The Verbandsgemeinde Thalfang am Erbeskopf consists of the following Ortsgemeinden ("local municipalities"):

Verbandsgemeinde in Rhineland-Palatinate